Janthinobacterium aquaticum is a Gram-negative, rod-shaped and motile bacterium from the genus of Janthinobacterium.

References

Burkholderiales
Bacteria described in 2020